Guilty Pleasures is the thirty-first studio album by Barbra Streisand. It was released in September 2005 in conjunction with Barry Gibb. In Ireland and the United Kingdom, the album is titled Guilty Too. It is the follow-up to Streisand's 1980 album, Guilty, which also featured Barry Gibb. The album features a cover of Gibb's late brother Andy's  song "(Our Love) Don't Throw It All Away".

In the United States the album peaked at no. 5 and has been certified Gold (500,000 copies sold) continuing Streisand's record of achieving the most gold and platinum records for a female artist, and in second place in general behind Elvis Presley. The album was also top 3 in the UK, where it has been certified Platinum (over 300,000 copies sold). Both albums can also be considered partial-collaboration albums, since Streisand not only did two duets with Gibb, but Gibb could also be heard as a background vocalist in a few other songs solely by the artist herself, along with the fact that both singers were on the cover for both albums issued.

DualDisc edition
A DualDisc edition of the album was released which contained the entire album in PCM Stereo, behind the scenes footage of the making of the album, interviews with Streisand and Gibb and 4 video performances, including an alternate piano version of "Letting Go".

Track listing
All songs published by Crompton Songs (BMI) and Warner-Tamlerlane Publishing Corp., except where noted.
"Come Tomorrow" with Barry Gibb (Ashley Gibb, Barry Gibb, Stephen Gibb) – 5:01
"Stranger in a Strange Land" (A. Gibb, B. Gibb, Stephen Gibb) – 4:50
"Hideaway" (A. Gibb, B. Gibb) – 4:14
"It's Up to You" (A. Gibb, B. Gibb) – 3:32
"Night of My Life" (A. Gibb, B. Gibb) – 4:01
"Above the Law" with Barry Gibb (A. Gibb, B. Gibb, S. Gibb, Streisand; Crompton Songs/Warner-Tamlerlane Publishing Corp./Emanuel Music-Warner-Tamerlane Publishing Corp./WB Music) – 4:27
"Without Your Love" (A. Gibb, B. Gibb) – 3:48
"All the Children" (A. Gibb, B. Gibb, S. Gibb) – 5:14
"Golden Dawn" (A. Gibb, B. Gibb, S. Gibb) – 4:40
"(Our Love) Don't Throw It All Away" (B. Gibb, Blue Weaver) – 4:01
"Letting Go" (George Bitzer, B. Gibb) – 3:53

Personnel

Barbra Streisand – vocals
Barry Gibb – vocals, guitar, string arrangement
Dan Warner – guitar
Doug Emery – keyboard, programming, string arrangement
Eero Turunen – keyboard
Julio Hernandez – bass
Lee Levin – drums
Richard Bravo – percussion
Tom Scott – saxophone on "Come Tomorrow" and "Hideaway"
Beth Cohen – vocals on "Night of My Life"
Leesa Richards – vocals on "Night of My Life"
Peter Graves – string arrangement, conductor
Larry Warrilow – string arrangement

Production
Barry Gibb - producer
John Merchant - producer, recording, engineering, mixing
Javier Carrion - additional engineering
Patrick Magee - assistant engineering
Ethan Carlson - assistant engineering
Bob Ludwig - mastering

Charts

Weekly charts

Year-end charts

Certifications and sales

References

Barbra Streisand albums
2005 albums
Columbia Records albums
Sequel albums